Marianska, Mariańska, Mariánska or Mariánská may refer to:

 Mariánská Týnice, a pilgrimage destination in the Czech Republic
 Gmina Puszcza Mariańska, a rural district in east-central Poland
 Puszcza Mariańska, a village in east-central Poland
 Mariánska hora, a hill in Levoča, Slovakia

See also
 
 Marianka (disambiguation)